Carl Adolf Wollert (11 March 1877 – 4 April 1953) was a Swedish sport shooter who competed in the 1912 Summer Olympics.

He was born in Kroksmåla, Kalmar Municipality and died in Tierp. In 1912 he was part of the Swedish team which finished fourth in the team clay pigeons event. In the individual trap competition he finished 56th.

References

1877 births
1943 deaths
Swedish male sport shooters
Trap and double trap shooters
Olympic shooters of Sweden
Shooters at the 1912 Summer Olympics
20th-century Swedish people